In economics, stable matching theory or simply matching theory, is the study of matching markets. Matching markets are distinguished from Walrasian markets in the focus of who matches with whom. Matching theory typically examines matching in the absence of search frictions, differentiating it from search and matching theory. In 2012, the Nobel Memorial Prize in Economic Sciences was awarded to Alvin E. Roth and Lloyd Shapley for their work on matching theory.

Overview
Matching has two main categories. One category is matching with nontransferrable utility (NTU), where match payoffs are nontransferable and stability requires individual rationality and double coincidence of wants. This strand of the literature emerged from the Gale and Shapley (1962) introduction of the stable marriage problem. The second category is matching with transferable utility (TU). The latter dates back to work on Monge (1781) and Kantorovich(1942) work on optimal transportation theory, in particular following Koopmans and Beckmann (1957) who studies the problem with pricing. Modern TU matching follows work by Shapley and Shubik (1971), who provided a TU equivalent of Gale and Shapley (1962), as well as Becker (1973) who applied TU matching to the marriage market.

Matching theory is typically focuses on two-sided matching, where two types of workers are considered (e.g. men and women in the marriage market, firms and workers in the labor market, and students matching with colleges). A smaller literature considers other types of matching, such as one-sided matching (e.g. the stable roommates problem) and many-sided matching (e.g. man-woman-child matching). Within two sided matching, three types of matches are considered: one-to-one, many-to-one, and many-to-many.

Matching theory has been applied to study positive questions, such as who matches with who, as well as normative questions regarding how to best design matching markets.

Applications
Matching theory has been applied to study a wide set of applications, including: marriage, housing allocation, kidney exchange, the National Resident Matching Program, and school choice.

Relationship with search and matching theory
Matching theory typically examines matching in the absence of search frictions in a centralized environment, differentiating it from search and matching theory. Under certain contexts, the search and matching equilibrium converges to a stable matching when search frictions disappear

See also
Matching theory (economics)

References 

Market (economics)